Laura Natalia Esquivel (born May 18, 1994, in Buenos Aires, Argentina), known professionally as Laura Esquivel, is an Argentine and Italian actress and singer, who gained international popularity for her debut acting role as Patricia "Patito" Castro in the popular Argentine children's telenovela, Patito Feo.

Biography
From the age of 7, Laura took singing, acting, piano and dance lessons in her native Argentina. She was first introduced to the general public on reality-musical format Codigo F.A.M.A. Argentina which was aired across Latin America in 2005. She was chosen to represent Argentina in the international version of the show and was one of the finalists in 2005.

Afterwards, she appeared in a tribute to Roberto Gómez Bolaños (Chespirito) in 2005 and in the variety show Sábado Gigante. She was also chosen as one of the leads in the musical Peter Pan which had a long run in Buenos Aires.

In 2005, Argentina's most-watched show, Showmatch, did a segment on talented kids. Her segment, in which she sang Disney songs, achieved extremely high ratings and big repercussion. Because of that, Marcelo Tinelli offered her a development deal and she was soon chosen as the lead in Patito Feo, a child-oriented telenovela produced by Ideas del Sur.

Patito Feo began filming in 2006 in Buenos Aires. Its soundtrack achieved multiple platinum certifications and a Gardel Award. The show was also a huge success, achieving high ratings and sold-out stadium concerts all over Latin America; it received a nomination for the International Emmy Awards in 2008 for the Children and Young People category.

After two seasons, Patito Feo ended in 2008. Laura continued touring with the cast throughout Argentina and Latin America. In 2008, the show became a huge success in Europe, especially in Turkey, Italy and Greece. Laura is currently learning Italian. She will tour the country soon with a stage production based on Patito Feo and was also chosen by Mediaset as one of the leads in a telenovela they will produce in Argentina. Esquivel learned Italian and starred in the Italian movie, Un paradiso per due alongside her former Patito Feo castmate Gaston Soffritti in 2009. The following year, Esquivel was cast in the Italian movie, Natale in Sudafrica. In 2010, while touring Italy and Greece, Laura signed an endorsement deal with Monnalisa to promote its Teenager line Jakioo. In 2011, Laura spent the majority of her time touring in Italy and Greece to promote the theatrical versions of Patito Feo. She is also a hostess on the Argentine teen TV show, Mundo Teen.

Discography
 2004 Peter Pan (soundtrack)
 2007 Patito Feo La Historia Más Linda
 2007 Patito Feo La Historia Más Linda En El Teatro
 2008 Patito Feo La Vida Es Una Fiesta
 2012 Giro Giro (Digital single)
 2012 Locura (Digital single)
 2012  Lenguaje perfecto (Digital single)
 2012  Aquel amor (Digital single)
 2012  Estarè Contigo (Digital single)
 2017 Divina

Filmography

References

External links
 lauraesquivel.tv
 

1994 births
Living people
Argentine film actresses
Argentine child actresses
21st-century Argentine women singers
Argentine pop singers
Argentine child singers
21st-century Argentine actresses